Dwarkadas Jivanlal Sanghvi College of Engineering, also known as D. J. Sanghvi, is an engineering college in Vile Parle, Mumbai.  The college was established by Shri Vile Parle Kelavani Mandal in 1994.

History
D. J. Sanghvi College of Engineering was established in 1994. It was named after Dwarkadas J. Sanghvi, an industrialist and pioneer in the pen industry. He manufactured Wilson Fountain Pens. It has been granted autonomous status effective from the academic year 2019-20.

Departments

The college has an intake of 600 students in eight branches for Bachelor of Engineering. The admissions are done on Merit basis, and there's a separate list for Gujarati linguistics minority, based on a lower merit criteria. The admission are done by DTE( Directorate of Technical Education,Maharashtra),this process is online.

 Biomedical Engineering
 Chemical Engineering
 Electronics Engineering
 Production Engineering
 Electronics and Telecommunication Engineering
 Information Technology
 Computer Engineering
 Mechanical Engineering
 Computer Science and Engineering (Data Science)

The college has Masters programs in the following branches:-
 Mechanical Engineering
 Computer Engineering
 Electronics and Telecommunication Engineering

Library

The Manubhai P. Knowledge Centre library is situated on the first floor of the college building. It is facilitated with reprography and Wi-Fi network connection. There are about 17,000 books, 70 printed journals and magazines (national and international) with four online databases: IEEE, IEL Online, ASME, ACM, and Springer Link.

Activities

DJSCE is the hub of various curricular, extra-curricular and technical activities which attracts participation and praise alike from numerous colleges across Maharashtra. DJCSI, an IT department student chapter of DJSCE, hosts the CodeShastra, a 24 Hours Hackathon across the Maharashtra state since 2014. DJSPARK is the most popular inter-state competition organized by the IETE-SF a student forum of Department of Electronics and Telecommunication Engineering. The college also encourages students to take part in various sport activities throughout the course.
DJS Helios is the official solar car team of the college. The team designs and fabricates solar cars from scratch for participating in various national level competitions. They were crowned Asian champions in the year 2018, when they became the first and only team to win the Electric Solar Vehicle Championship(ESVC) and the Indo Asian Solar Challenge(IASC) in the same year.

Festivals
The annual sports, technical and cultural festival of the college is known as Trinity. It is held in February or March and is attended by engineering students from colleges all over Mumbai. It has various events like Flex and Mascot Dance, Inter-departmental Dances, Talent Competition, Fashion Show, DJ Talks (like TED Talks), Mono Act, Classroom Decoration, Street Play, Traditional Day, Gaming Events and Department Wars.

See also
List of Mumbai Colleges

References

External links

Engineering colleges in Mumbai
Jain universities and colleges